The Miss Guatemala 2010 pageant was held on April 25, 2010 at Auditorio Nacional in the capital city Guatemala City, Guatemala. This year only 14 candidates were competing for the national crown. The chosen winner represented Guatemala at the Miss Universe 2010 and at Miss Continente Americano 2010. The winner of best national costume, the costume was use in Miss Universe 2010. Miss World Guatemala represented Guatemala at the Miss World 2010. Miss Guatemala Internacional represented Guatemala at the Miss International 2010. The Semifinalist entered Miss Intercontinental 2010, Top Model of the World 2010 and Reina Hispanoamericana 2010.

The winner of Miss Guatemala 2010 could not enter Miss Universe 2010 because she had an accident. Miss Guatemala Internacional, Jessica Scheel took her spot and placed Guatemala in the Top 10 after 26 years without placing in the semifinals. One of the semifinalist took her spot in Miss International 2010. Miss Guatemala 2010 would enter Miss Universe 2011 without re-entering the pageant.

Final Results

Special Awards
 Miss Photogenic – Claudia García  (Chimaltenango)
 Miss Congeniality  – Michelle Taylor  (Petén)
 Best National Costume – Ana Mazariegos  ( Sacatepéquez)

Final Competition Scores

 Winner 
 Miss World Guatemala
 Miss Guatemala Internacional
 Top 6 Semifinalists

Official Delegates

External links
Official Website
http://alebarillas.com

Miss Guatemala
2010 beauty pageants